The women's 4 × 400 metres relay event at the 2015 African Games was held on 17 September.

Results

References

Relay
2015 in women's athletics